The Knockbracken Healthcare Park  is a mental health facility based on the Saintfield Road, Belfast, Northern Ireland. It is managed by the Belfast Health and Social Care Trust.

History 
The facility was commissioned to replace the old Belfast Asylum on Grosvenor Road. It was decided to acquire Purdysburn House, an early 19th century house designed by Thomas Hopper for Narcissus Batt, a banker, and its extensive grounds. The new mental health facilities, known as Purdysburn Villa Colony, were designed by George Thomas Hine and Tulloch and
Fitzsimmons with the first four new villas being built on the eastern part of the site in 1906 and a further six villas, together with recreation hall, administration block and churches, being built in a similar location in 1913. It joined the National Health Service as Purdysburn Hospital in 1948 and subsequently evolved to become Knockbracken Healthcare Park.

Purdysburn House itself, which had been built on the western part of the site, was demolished in 1965 and HM Prison Hydebank Wood was built in that location in 1979.

References

Belfast Health and Social Care Trust
Health and Social Care (Northern Ireland) hospitals
Hospital buildings completed in 1929
Hospitals in Belfast
1829 establishments in Ireland
Maternity hospitals in the United Kingdom